The John A. and Maggie Jones House is located in Columbus, Wisconsin.

History
John A. Jones was a noted pharmacist. The house was added to the State and the National Register of Historic Places in 2009.

References

Houses on the National Register of Historic Places in Wisconsin
National Register of Historic Places in Columbia County, Wisconsin
Houses in Columbia County, Wisconsin
Queen Anne architecture in Wisconsin
Houses completed in 1900